Tears is New Zealand pop group The Crocodiles's first album. Both the album and title track were released in April 1980. Both reached #17 on the New Zealand album and singles charts respectively that year. The band's second single, "Whatcha Gonna Do", however wasn't as successful, failing to chart. That year they won 'Best Group' and 'Most Promising Group' at the New Zealand Music Awards.

Track listing
 "New Wave Goodbye" (Flaws) – 3:20
 "Any Day Of The Week" (Baysting/Flaws/Dasent) - 3:29
 "All Night Long" (Flaws/Backhouse) - 3:30
 "Tears" (Baysting/Flaws) - 3:55
 "In My Suit" (Flaws) - 3:44
 "Young Ladies In Hot Cars" (Baysting/Backhouse) - 3:08
 "Whatcha Gonna Do" (Baysting/Dasent) - 2:37
 "Ribbons Of Steel" (Flaws/Foley/Dasent/Backhouse) - 3:03
 "It's The Latest" (Baysting/Backhouse) - 2:28
 "Working Girl" (Baysting/Flaws/Dasent) - 3:21

Singles
 "Tears"/"In My Suit" - RCA (MS 433) (1980) (NZ #17)
 "Whatcha Gonna Do"/"All Night Long" - RCA (103619) (1980)
 "New Wave Goodbye"/"Ribbons of Steel" - Aura (AUS126) (1981)

Personnel 
 Bass, Vocals - Tina Matthews
 Drums - Bruno Lawrence
 Guitar, Vocals - Tony Backhouse
 Guitar, Vocals - Fane Flaws
 Piano, Organ - Peter Dasent
 Vocals - Jenny Morris

Videos
 "Tears"
 "Any Day Of The Week"

1980 debut albums
The Crocodiles albums